Janne Daniel Sankelo (born 1 January 1967 in Hyvinkää) is a Finnish politician currently serving in the Parliament of Finland for the National Coalition Party at the Vaasa constituency.

References

1967 births
Living people
People from Hyvinkää
National Coalition Party politicians
Members of the Parliament of Finland (2011–15)
Members of the Parliament of Finland (2019–23)